Riccardo Ajmone-Marsan (1889-1958) was an Italian footballer 
who played for Juventus.

Biography 
Riccardo Ajmone-Marsan was introduced - together with the brothers Alessandro and Annibale - to the team of the White-Blacks by Umberto Malvano, one of the founders of Juventus F.C. Riccardo, Alessandro and Annibale convinced their father Marco to pay the rent of the Velodrome Umberto I.

In 1921 Riccardo married Adelina Lavini (1901-1990), by whom he had three children: Maria (1922-1922), Giuliana (1923-2017) and Giorgio (1926-2008).

He was also known as Ajmone I, to distinguish him from his two brothers and teammates Alessandro and Annibale.

Career 
Playing as goalkeeper for the second team in Turin, Riccardo won the Second Category in 1905, beating the reserves of Milan and Genoa in the final national round. On 10 April 1910 he made his debut in the first team scoring the decisive goal in a 1-0 win over Andrea Doria.

On 11 February 1912 he played his last match against Inter Milan, which ended in a 4-0 defeat.

In total he played - wearing the black and white striped shirt - 9 matches and scored 2 goals for Juventus F.C., the last one scored in a 2-1 defeat against US Milanese on 24 April 1910.

References

Further reading
 

1889 births
1958 deaths
Footballers from Turin
Italian footballers
Juventus F.C. players
Association football goalkeepers
Association football midfielders